John Steven Mabry (born October 17, 1970) is an American former professional baseball player, broadcaster, and coach. He is a coach for the Miami Marlins of Major League Baseball (MLB). He had 898 career hits in 3,409 at-bats (for a batting average of .263), with 96 home runs and 446 RBI. John Mabry attended West Chester University of Pennsylvania and was inducted into their Athletics Hall of Fame.

Early life
Mabry, a graduate of Bohemia Manor High School, in Chesapeake City, Maryland, played three years at West Chester University of Pennsylvania, before being drafted by the St. Louis Cardinals in the 6th round of the  amateur draft.

Playing career
During his 14-year MLB career Mabry played for eight teams, including three different stints with the Cardinals (–, –). In Mabry's only season with over 400 at-bats, he led the Cardinals with 161 hits and was fourth in the National League for first basemen in fielding percentage at .994 and was errorless in 14 games in the outfield. He hit for a natural cycle in a May 18, loss to the Colorado Rockies.

Mabry was one of the few major leaguers who preferred not to wear batting gloves. He was also somewhat versatile on defense, playing more than 100 games at left and right field as well as first and third base. He also made two career appearances pitching with dubious results. In one inning of work, he gave up seven earned runs for a career ERA of 63.

Post-playing career
In April 2011, Fox Sports Midwest hired Mabry to serve as baseball analyst during St. Louis Cardinals live pre-game and post-game shows, a role he shared with former Cardinals Mike Matheny and Cal Eldred.

On December 2, 2011, the Cardinals named Mabry the assistant hitting coach to Mark McGwire in 2012, soon after announcing former teammate Mike Matheny would be the new manager. On November 5, 2012, the Cardinals promoted Mabry to hitting coach following McGwire's departure to the Los Angeles Dodgers. Former major league catcher Bengie Molina succeeded Mabry as the assistant hitting coach.
Mabry was released from his position as hitting coach with the St. Louis Cardinals when manager Mike Matheny was fired on July 14, 2018, just days before the All-Star break of the 2018 season.  

On December 5, 2019, Mabry was added to the Kansas City Royals staff as a major league coach.

On December 13, 2022, Mabry was added to the Miami Marlins staff as a major league assistant hitting coach.

Personal life
After his 2007 retirement as a player, Mabry continued to make his home in the St. Louis area along with his wife Ann and their four children. Long an avid outdoorsman, Mabry became a spokesman for Gander Mountain, making a series of videos on different aspects of hunting and fishing.

See also
 List of St. Louis Cardinals coaches
 List of Major League Baseball players to hit for the cycle

References

External links

John Mabry at Baseball Almanac

1970 births
Living people
Arkansas Travelers players
Baseball coaches from Delaware
Baseball players from Wilmington, Delaware
Brevard County Manatees players
Chicago Cubs players
Colorado Rockies players
Florida Marlins players
Hamilton Redbirds players
Kansas City Royals coaches
Louisville Redbirds players
Major League Baseball first basemen
Major League Baseball hitting coaches
Memphis Redbirds players
Oakland Athletics players
Philadelphia Phillies players
San Diego Padres players
Savannah Cardinals players
Seattle Mariners players
Springfield Cardinals players
St. Louis Cardinals coaches
St. Louis Cardinals players
Tacoma Rainiers players
West Chester Golden Rams baseball players
People from Chesapeake City, Maryland